In enzymology, a protein xylosyltransferase is an enzyme that catalyzes the chemical reaction in which a beta-D-xylosyl residue is transferred from UDP-D-xylose to the sidechain oxygen atom of a serine residue in a protein.

This enzyme belongs to the family of glycosyltransferases, specifically the pentosyltransferases.  The systematic name of this enzyme class is UDP-D-xylose:protein beta-D-xylosyltransferase. Other names in common use include UDP-D-xylose:core protein beta-D-xylosyltransferase, UDP-D-xylose:core protein xylosyltransferase, UDP-D-xylose:proteoglycan core protein beta-D-xylosyltransferase, UDP-xylose-core protein beta-D-xylosyltransferase, uridine diphosphoxylose-core protein beta-xylosyltransferase, and uridine diphosphoxylose-protein xylosyltransferase.  This enzyme participates in the biosynthesis of chondroitin sulfate and glycan structures.

Human proteins
 XYLT1
 XYLT2

See also
 Xylosyltransferase

References

 
 

EC 2.4.2
Enzymes of unknown structure